Heavy as a Really Heavy Thing is the debut studio album by Canadian extreme metal band Strapping Young Lad. It was released on April 4, 1995. Century Media Europe released a remastered version of the album on June 12, 2006, which includes the video for "S.Y.L.", several bonus tracks, and a 12-page booklet containing extended liner notes.

Background 
Strapping Young Lad began in 1994 as a solo project of Canadian musician Devin Townsend. Following his work as vocalist on Steve Vai's 1993 album Sex & Religion and its 1994 tour, Townsend believed he had been a "musical whore", spending "the first five years of [his] career working at the behest of other people". During a brief stint as touring guitarist for The Wildhearts, Townsend received a phone call from an A&R representative for Roadrunner Records, expressing an interest in his demos and an intention to sign him. The offer was ultimately rescinded by the head of Roadrunner, who regarded Townsend's recordings as "just noise". He faced further rejection by Relativity Records, the label behind Vai's Sex & Religion, who saw no commercial appeal in his music. Century Media Records subsequently contacted the musician, offering him a contract to "make us some extreme albums". Townsend agreed to a five-album deal with the record label.

Following his tour with The Wildhearts, Townsend began recording and producing his debut album, Heavy as a Really Heavy Thing, under the moniker Strapping Young Lad. According to Townsend, the recording process took "about a week". Embracing The Wildhearts' anarchist approach, "while focusing on dissonance and just being as over-the-top as [he] could", Townsend sang on the record and performed the majority of its instrumental tracks (with the assistance of a drum machine). A few songs, however, featured local session musicians, including guitarist Jed Simon, Townsend's future bandmate.

Release and reception 
Released on April 4, 1995, Heavy as a Really Heavy Thing was not widely recognized in the metal community. The album sold 143 copies in its first six months, but received favorable reviews from the heavy metal press. Its unusual musical ideas—a synthesis of death, thrash, and industrial metal influences—prompted Andy Stout from Metal Hammer to call it "one of the most disturbing albums you'll hear for a very long time". Nevertheless, Townsend has repeatedly expressed his distaste for the recording. He dismissed the album in the liner notes of the record's 2006 reissue, contending that it contained only two great songs. He also deemed its production poor in interviews, referring to the album as "basically a collection of demos that were remixed". When Century Media advertised the reissue of Heavy as a Really Heavy Thing as the "rebirth of a genre-defying classic", Townsend called it "record company bullshit".

The album was remastered and re-released on June 12, 2006, by Century Media Europe. The re-release contains several bonus tracks taken from international versions of the album, an unreleased track, and the video for "S.Y.L.".

Track listing

Personnel
Devin Townsend – guitar, vocals, keyboards, programming, mixing, editing, production, arrangements, child voice on Track #1, art direction (as Nived)

Additional musicians
Adrian White – drums
Jed Simon – additional guitar ("Critic", "Skin Me")
Chris Byes – drums ("Critic", "The Filler: Sweet City Jesus")
Chris Meyers – additional keyboards ("Goat", "Skin Me")
Greg Price – assistant on drum programming ("Skin Me", "Drizzlehell")
Smokin' Lord Toot – drums ("Cod Metal King")
Stooly and E: Val Yum – Bon Jovi gang vocals
Ashley Scribner – bass
Mike Sudar – guitar

Production
Blair Calibaba – engineering
Rod Michaels – additional engineering ("Critic")
Greg Reely – editing, mixing
Jason Mausa – mixing ("The Filler: Sweet City Jesus")
Jamie Myers – additional editing
Doctor Skinny – additional mixing
Brian Gardner – mastering
Tania Rudy – photography
Byron Stroud – photography
Robert Lowden – cover art
Borivoj Krgin – A&R

References

Strapping Young Lad albums
1995 debut albums
Century Media Records albums
Albums produced by Devin Townsend